Pyewacket is a children's novel written by Rosemary Weir and illustrated by Charles Pickard.  First published in 1967, the narrative centers on the demolition of a series of row houses from the viewpoint(s) of Pyewacket, a resilient alley cat, and his friends, who stay on the property and adapt to a new life.

1967 American novels
American children's novels
Children's novels about animals
1967 children's books
Novels about cats